The 1974 LFF Lyga was the 53rd season of the LFF Lyga football competition in Lithuania.  It was contested by 25 teams, and Tauras Siauliai won the championship.

Group Zalgiris

Group Nemunas

Final

References
RSSSF

LFF Lyga seasons
1974 in Lithuania
LFF